Uptownship is a 1989 studio album by South African trumpeter Hugh Masekela. It was recorded in New York City and Jersey City, and released via Novus Records label. This is his last album in exile before the end of apartheid.

Reception
Richard S. Ginell of Allmusic noted: "The title of this New York City-recorded album suggests a combination of township jive and uptown Gotham soul and energy, but what we get is some of the former and little of the latter. Here, Masekela alternates South African-inflected pop/jazz with lugubrious covers of a couple of U.S. soul tunes ... and a Bob Marley anthem, 'No Woman, No Cry.'"

Track listing

References

External links

1989 albums
Hugh Masekela albums